George Knapper (born 27 February 1993) is a London-based musical theatre performer often cast for his tap dancing skills and youthful appearance.  For his 2015 appearance in Love Birds, Knapper was named one of five British theatrical performers as "Ones To Watch in 2016" by British-based theatre journalist Terri Paddock.

Early life
Knapper was born and raised in Crewe, England, where he was the third of five children.  Knapper attended Malbank School and Sixth Form College in Crewe. He trained professionally in Musical Theatre at Performance Preparation Academy in Guildford.

Career
Since Graduating in 2014, his theatre credits include: Love Birds (The Pleasance, Edinburgh) as "Puck"; Qdos Entertainment Pantomimes:  Peter Pan (Crewe Lyceum) as "Peter"; Snow White and the Seven Dwarfs (Theatre Royal, Newcastle; Hull, New Theatre; Orchard Theatre, Dartford; Lyceum Theatre, Crewe) and Joseph and the Technicolor Dreamcoat (2016/19 UK tour) as "Benjamin".

His theatre credits whilst training include: Meshak Gardiner in Coram Boy (Holy Trinity Church/PPA); The Fix (Electric Theatre/PPA); Curtis Hallerbread in The Witches of Eastwick (Electric Theatre/PPA) and Laurie in Little Women (Electric Theatre/PPA).

References

English tenors
English male musical theatre actors
English male stage actors
Living people
1993 births